Apollonia was an ancient town on the island of Siphnos.

Its site is unlocated.

References

Populated places in the ancient Aegean islands
Former populated places in Greece
Lost ancient cities and towns
Sifnos